Benkos Biohó (late 16th century — 1621), also known as Domingo Biohó was a Mandinka and South American leader who escaped from the slave port of Cartagena with ten others and founded San Basilio de Palenque, then known as the "village of the maroons", located in what is now Northern Colombia. In 1713 it became the first free village in the Americas by decree from the King of Spain, when he gave up sending his troops on futile missions to attack their fortified mountain hideaway.

Biography 

Biohó was born into a royal family in Guinea Bissau. He was of Mandinka origin He was seized by the Portuguese slave trader, Pedro Gomes Reinel, sold to businessman Juan Palacios, and later, after transportation to what is now Colombia in South America, sold again to the Spaniard Alonso del Campo in 1596, in Cartagena de Indias. He made his first escape when the boat that was transporting him down the Magdalena River sank. He was recaptured but escaped again in 1599 into the marshy lands southeast of Cartagena. He organized an army that came to dominate all of the Montes de María region. He also formed an intelligence network and used the information collected to help organize more escapes and to guide the runaway slaves into the liberated territory, known as settlement. He used the title "king of Arcabuco".

On 18 July 1605, the Governor of Cartagena, Gerónimo de Suazo y Casasola, unable to defeat the Maroons, offered a peace treaty to Biohó, recognising the autonomy of the Matuna Bioho Palenque and accepting his entrance into the city armed and dressed in Spanish fashion, while the palenque promised to stop receiving more runaway slaves, cease their aid in escape attempts, and stop addressing Biohó as "king". Peace was finalized in 1612 under the governorship of Diego Fernández de Velasco. The treaty was violated by the Spaniards in 1619 when they captured Biohó as he was walking carelessly into the city. He was hanged and quartered on 16 March 1621. Governor García Girón, who ordered the execution, argued bitterly that "it was dangerous the extent to which Biohó was respected in the population" and that "his lies and enchantment would drive the nations of Guinea away from the city."

The betrayal contributed to the history of distrust of Colombia's government.

By the end of the seventeenth century, Montes de María had over 600 maroons, under the command of Domingo Padilla, who claimed for himself the title of captain while his wife Jane adopted that of viceroy, and successfully challenged further attempts at sovereignty from the colonial authorities.

San Basilio de Palenque was declared Masterpieces of the Oral and Intangible Heritage of Humanity by UNESCO in 2005.

References

Further reading
 Djemâa Chraïti Benkos Biohò L'esclave libre ou le roi de la Matuna chraitihttps://editions-sydney-laurent.fr/brand/djemaa-/

External links
Africans in Americas
 Central Africans and Cultural Transformations in the American Diaspora By Linda Marinda Heywood 
 Africa and the Americas: Interconnections During the Slave Trade By José C. Curto, Renée Soulodre-LaFrance Published 2005 Africa World Press Slave trade 
Africana: The Encyclopedia of the African and African American Experience By Henry Louis Gates, Anthony Appiah 

16th-century births
Year of birth uncertain
1621 deaths
Colombian people of Bissau-Guinean descent
Maroons (people)
Rebel slaves
Slave rebellions in South America
Portuguese slaves
17th-century slaves
17th-century rebels
Slavery in Colombia